Swimming competitions at the 2022 South American Games in Asuncion, Paraguay were held between October 2 and 5, 2022 at the Centro Acuático Nacional

Schedule
The competition schedule is as follows:

Medal summary

Medal table

Medalists

Men

Women

Mixed

Participation
Fourteen nations participated in swimming events of the 2022 South American Games.

References

Swimming
South American Games
2022
2022 South American Games